The 2021 Royal London One-Day Cup tournament was a limited overs cricket competition that formed part of the 2021 English cricket season in England and Wales. Matches were contested over 50 overs per side, having List A cricket status, with all eighteen first-class counties competing in the tournament. The tournament started on 22 July 2021, with the final taking place on 19 August 2021 at Trent Bridge in Nottingham. Somerset were the defending champions winning the 2019 tournament, with no tournament taking place in 2020 due to the COVID-19 pandemic.

In August 2021, the Group A match between Middlesex and Gloucestershire was cancelled due to a COVID-19 outbreak in the Gloucestershire team. Therefore, the group was decided on an average points per game basis.

On the final day of group stage matches, Durham and Glamorgan qualified to the semi-finals, after finishing at top of their respective groups. Gloucestershire, Essex from group A, and Surrey, Yorkshire from group B, all qualified to the quarter-finals. In the first quarter-final, Essex beat Yorkshire by 129 runs to advance. The second quarter-final saw Surrey beat Gloucestershire by five wickets to also advance. Glamorgan beat Essex by five wickets in the first semi-final to progress to the final of the tournament. They were joined in the final by Durham, who beat Surrey by five wickets in the second semi-final match. Glamorgan won the tournament, beating Durham by 58 runs in the final.

Format
Each county played eight group stage matches – four at home and four away, with the top three counties in each group progressing to the knockout stages.

Teams
The teams were placed into the following groups:

 Group A: Durham, Essex, Gloucestershire, Hampshire, Kent, Lancashire, Middlesex, Sussex, Worcestershire
 Group B: Derbyshire, Glamorgan, Leicestershire, Northamptonshire, Nottinghamshire, Somerset, Surrey, Warwickshire, Yorkshire

Group A
Source:

Group B
Source:

Group A

Fixtures
Source:

July

August

Group B

Fixtures
Source:

July

August

Standings

Group A

  advanced directly to the semi-finals
  advanced to the quarter-finals

Group B

  advanced directly to the semi-finals
  advanced to the quarter-finals

Knockout stage
The winner of each group progressed directly to the semi-finals. The second and third placed teams in each group then played a play-off match against a team from the other group. The winners of those matches then played one of the group winners in the semi-finals.

Quarter-finals

Semi-finals

Final

References

External links
 Series home at ESPN Cricinfo

Royal London One-Day Cup
Royal London One-Day Cup